Stenalia atra is a beetle in the genus Stenalia of the family Mordellidae. It was described in 1875.

References

atra
Beetles described in 1875